Graveley may refer to:

 Graveley, Hertfordshire
 Graveley, Cambridgeshire

See also
 Gravely (disambiguation)